Markabang is a village and Village Development Committee in Pyuthan, a Middle Hills district of Lumbini Province, western Nepal.

Villages in this VDC

References

External links
UN map of VDC boundaries, water features and roads in Pyuthan District

Populated places in Pyuthan District